Bríd Ní Neachtain (born 1959) is an Irish actress known for Dancing at Lughnasa.

Early life 
Born in Galway, Neachtain is a native of Connemara. She starred in an adaptation of Máirtín Ó Cadhain's 1948 novel, Cré na Cille. She was educated at Coláiste Chroí Mhuire in Spiddal.

Career 
In her late teens, hearing that an assistant stage manager was leaving the Abbey Theatre, she wrote to Tomás Mac Canna, the director, and got the job. On occasion he gave her small parts in Irish language plays and this later developed into larger roles in both Irish and English.
After her performance in Silver Dollar Boys, Joe Dowling invited her to join the Abbey Actors. She remained with them until the 1990s when she left to work in TG4's soap, Ros na Rún. She is a former board member of Irish language broadcaster, TG4.

Personal life 
She is married to former Senator Fiach Mac Conghail; they have two children.

She appeared on an Irish 55-cent stamp in 2008, depicted in a still from Cré na Cille.

Filmography

Film

Television

References

External links
 

1959 births
Living people
20th-century Irish people
21st-century Irish people
Actresses from County Galway
Irish stage actresses
TG4 people
Mac Conghail family